Mandandeupur is a municipality in Kavrepalanchok District of Bagmati Province of Nepal.

References

External links
Official website

Populated places in Kavrepalanchok District
Municipalities in Bagmati Province
Nepal municipalities established in 2017